Chloro(triphenylphosphine)gold(I) or triphenylphosphinegold(I) chloride is a coordination complex with the formula (Ph3P)AuCl.  This colorless solid is a common reagent for research on gold compounds.

Preparation and structure
The complex is prepared by reducing chloroauric acid with triphenylphosphine in 95% ethanol:
HAuCl4  +  H2O  +  2 PPh3   →   (Ph3P)AuCl  +  Ph3PO  +  3 HCl

Ph3PAuCl can also be prepared by treating a thioether complex of gold like (dimethyl sulfide)gold(I) chloride, [(Me2S)AuCl], with triphenylphosphine.

The complex adopts a linear coordination geometry, which is typical of most gold(I) compounds.
It crystallizes in the orthorhombic space group P212121 with a = 12.300(4) Å, b = 13.084(4) Å, c = 10.170(3) Å with Z = 4 formula units per unit cell.

Reactivity
Triphenylphosphinegold(I) chloride is a popular stable precursor for a cationic gold(I) catalyst used in organic synthesis. Typically, it is treated with silver(I) salts of weakly coordinating anions (e.g., X– = SbF6–, BF4–, TfO–, or Tf2N–) to generate a weakly bound Ph3PAu–X complex, in equilibrium with the catalytically-active species [Ph3PAu]+X– in solution.  Among these, only the bistriflimide complex Ph3PAuNTf2 can be isolated as the pure compound.  The nitrate complex Ph3PAuONO2 and the oxonium species [(Ph3PAu)3O]+[BF4]– are also prepared from the chloride.

As shown in the scheme below, the methyl complex Ph3PAuMe is prepared from triphenylphosphinegold(I) chloride by transmetalation with a Grignard reagent.  Further treatment of Ph3PAuMe with methyllithium displaces the phosphine ligand and generates lithium di- and tetramethylaurate, Li+[AuMe2]– and Li+[AuMe4]–, respectively.

References

Triphenylphosphine complexes
Gold(I) compounds
Chlorides
Chloro complexes
Gold–halogen compounds